Electoral history of Pauline Hanson.

Australian Senate elections

2022 
{| style="width:100%;"
|-style=vertical-align:top
|

2016

2007

2004

2001

Australian House of Representatives elections

1998

1996 

*Pauline Hanson had been disendorsed as the Liberal candidate and ran as an independent, but she remained a Liberal on the ballot paper.

Queensland State elections

2015

2009

NSW State elections

2011

2003

Notes

References

External links 

Pauline Hanson